Netta  is a group of villages in Gmina Augustów in north-eastern Poland, close to the Netta river. It is divided into:
Netta Pierwsza (Netta I)
Netta Druga (Netta II)
Netta-Folwark

Villages in Augustów County